Sara Facio (born 18 April 1932) is an Argentine photographer. She is best known for having photographed, along with Alicia D'Amico, various cultural personalities, including Argentine writers Julio Cortázar, María Elena Walsh and Alejandra Pizarnik. Facio also was instrumental in establishing a publishing house for photographic work in Latin America and for the creation of a prominent photographic exhibition space in Argentina.

Biography 
Facio was born in Argentina in 1932. She graduated from the Escuela Nacional de Bellas Artes in 1953. Later, she worked as an assistant to Annemarie Heinrich and started taking her own photographs in 1957.

In 1960, Facio and Alicia D'Amico opened a photography studio together. Facio co-founded La Azotea with María Cristina Orive in 1973. La Azotea was the first publishing house printing photo books in Latin America. In 1985, Facio established the Fotogalería of the Teatro Municipal General San Martín, which has become of the most prominent photographic exhibition spaces in Argentina. Facio served as the director of the gallery until 1998. In 1996, Facio illustrated Manuelita, a book of poetry by María Elena Walsh. A large exhibition of her work, taken between 1972 and 1974 and focusing on the effect that Juan Domingo Perón had on the country, was shown at the Museo de Arte Latinoamericano de Buenos Aires, MALBA, in 2018. She was granted the Platinum Konex Award from Argentina in 1992.

Her work is in the collection of the Museum of Modern Art, MoMA.

Sara Facio donated 25% of the photographs that make up the photographic heritage of the National Museum of Fine Arts from her personal archive.

References 

1932 births
Living people
Argentine photographers
Portrait photographers
Argentine publishers (people)
Lesbian photographers
Argentine lesbian artists
Argentine LGBT photographers
Argentine women photographers
Illustrious Citizens of Buenos Aires
People from San Isidro, Buenos Aires
20th-century Argentine women artists
21st-century Argentine artists
20th-century photographers
21st-century photographers
20th-century women photographers
21st-century women photographers